José Arturo Rivas Mortera (born 18 October 1984) is a Mexican former professional footballer who played as a centre-back.

Rivas has spent the most of his career in Tigres, winning three Liga MX, one Copa MX and one Campeón de Campeones championships.

Tigres UANL 
Jose Arturo Rivas played most of his career with Tigres playing since 2004 to 2018 ending his career at Veracruz in 2018. In the 105th minute of the game, Jose Arturo Rivas received a red card because of violent conduct and being part of a massive brawl in the Apertura 2016 Liga MX Final vs Club America but his team still ended up winning the final on penalties with Nahuel Guzman stopping every penalty shot.

Rivas was born on October 18, 1984, in Coatzacoalcos, Veracruz and at the age of 18 he enrolled with Tigres and from that day on he has never left the institution. La Palma Rivas received the opportunity to be registered in the UANL Tigres first team for the 2004 Apertura. Little by little, he has been gaining the trust of the various coaches who have directed him. n the 2006 Clausura tournament, he suffered an injury that took him away from the courts for approximately a year and a half. In the 2011 Apertura he won the first championship of his career in the Mexican First Division with the UANL Tigres. Three years later, together with the cats, he won his second title in his career now in the 2014 Copa MX Clausura.

So many moments with the felines, fights for relegation, classics of all kinds, historical triumphs, painful defeats, glorious goals and of course the best of all the championships won in 2011 - 2015 make La Palma dream, think and want to finish its career wearing the Tigres shirt. In 2015 it was undoubtedly the best year for Rivas. He won the starting role in the Clausura 2015 filling the vacancy left by the injured Juninho. since he took the place his absence was not noticed and he even managed to do better. From there he gained the trust of Ricardo Ferretti. In that same year José Rivas decided to study the career of Technical Trainer with the aim of being linked to football for a long time. The Veracruz native knows that at 31 years of age, his retirement as a player is approaching, however, he wants to remain in one way or another on the field of play.

Honours
Tigres UANL
Liga MX: Apertura 2011, Apertura 2015, Apertura 2016
Copa MX: Clausura 2014
Campeón de Campeones: 2016

External links
 
 
 
 
 José Arturo Rivas at ZeroZero

Footballers from Veracruz
Living people
Association football defenders
Tigres UANL footballers
People from Coatzacoalcos
1984 births
Mexico international footballers
Mexican footballers